Frederick Austin (31 January 1902 – October 1990) was a British painter, etcher and engraver.

He studied at Leicester College of Art and his brother was Robert Austin. He won the Prix de Rome in 1927 for his work Flight into Egypt. His work was part of the painting event in the art competition at the 1948 Summer Olympics.

References

1902 births
1990 deaths
20th-century British painters
British male painters
Olympic competitors in art competitions
People from Leicester
20th-century British male artists